is a mountain range of Hokkaidō, Japan. Unlike much of the rest of Japan, the Kitami Mountains are not very seismically active.

The Kitami Mountains are north of the Ishikari Mountains and east of the Teshio Mountains. A depression separates the Kitami Mountains from the Yūbari Mountains. The highest point in the Kitami Mountains is Mount Teshio. Mount Teshio sits atop the Wenshiri horst.

Geology
Rocks from the Kitami mountains are mostly sedimentary from the Cretaceous-Paleogene periods. Volcanic rock was placed down on top of this from volcanoes that erupted in the Miocene or later.

The Kitami Mountains formed in the inner arc of the Kurile Arc.

Mountains
  (1,558m)
  (1,446m)
  (1,345m)
  (1,142m)
  (1,129m)
  (987m)
  (818m)

References

Mountain ranges of Hokkaido